Monchhichis is an American animated series based on the stuffed toy line of dolls, released by the Japanese company Sekiguchi Corporation. Produced by Hanna-Barbera, it premiered on ABC on September 10, 1983 as part of The Monchhichis/Little Rascals/Richie Rich Show, replacing Pac-Man (which had by then been given its own half-hour time slot) from the previous season.

The series aired as part of a package show with The Little Rascals and Richie Rich through the end of 1983, but as early as January 7, 1984, because of lower-than-anticipated ratings, the package show was split up into two separate half-hour shows - Monchhchis moved to 8:00 a.m. ET, switching slots with The New Scooby and Scrappy-Doo Show (which aired initially at 11:30 a.m. ET), the latter of which would move to 9:00 a.m. ET and The Little Rascals and Richie Rich remained in the 8:30 a.m. ET slot, as a downgraded package series The Little Rascals/Richie Rich Show for the remainder of the 1983-84 season.

The half-hour episodes were later re-aired as part of the USA Cartoon Express during the late 1980s.

Plot 
The Monchhichis are monkey-like creatures who live in the forest land of Monchia at the very top of tall trees well above the clouds. The tribe's leader Wizzar is a magical wizard who can make up spells and potions to defeat their enemy, Horrg and the evil Grumplins of Grumplor.

Voice cast 
 Robert Arbogast – Snogs
 Peter Cullen – Snitchit, Gonker
 Laurie Faso – Scumgor, Yabbot
 Ellen Gerstell – Tootoo
 Hettie Lynne Hurtes – 
 Laurie Main – 
 Joe Medalis – 
 Sidney Miller - Horgg
 Bobby Morse – Moncho
 Frank Nelson – Wizzar 
 Laurel Page – Kyla
 Hank Saroyan – Thumkii 
 Rick Segall – 
 Frank Welker – Patchit
 Bill Woodson –

List of episodes

Home media
An episode of the show ("Tickle Pickle") was released as part of Saturday Morning Cartoons: The 1980s DVD set by Warner Home Video in 2010. On April 18, 2017, Warner Archive released Monchhichis: The Complete Series on DVD in region 1, as part of their Hanna-Barbera Classics Collection. This is a Manufacture-on-Demand (MOD) release, available exclusively through Warner's online store and Amazon.com.

See also

References

External links 
 

1980s American animated television series
1983 American television series debuts
1984 American television series endings
American Broadcasting Company original programming
Television series by Hanna-Barbera
Animated television series about monkeys
English-language television shows
American animated television spin-offs
American children's animated adventure television series
American children's animated comedy television series
American children's animated fantasy television series